Video Volunteers is an international media and human rights NGO founded in 2003 that promotes community media to enable citizen participation in marginalized and poor communities around the world. Video Volunteers is a registered non-profit in the state of New York in the US.

History
Video Volunteers was founded in 2003 by Jessica Mayberry after she spent a year as a fellow of the American India Foundation training rural Indian women in filmmaking. Video Volunteers originally operated from offices in New York, NY and Goa, India. Mayberry works closely with India Director Stalin K, Indian documentary filmmaker and community radio activist, as well as original co-founder of Drishti Media, Arts and Human Rights.

Work

Video Volunteers’ provides disadvantaged communities with the journalistic, critical thinking and creative skills they need. VV's models for locally owned and managed media production teach people to articulate and share their perspectives on the issues that matter to them – on a local and a global scale. Through communication media, Video Volunteers offers a livelihood option for people from poor areas while also providing a service to those communities. To this end, VV uses their low-cost community media models.

Programs

IndiaUnheard, is a program that is constituted of a network of "community correspondents" who are stringers trained to tell stories about their own communities. IndiaUnheard Community Correspondents make 3-4 min videos for which Video Volunteers pays Rs 1300 each. These videos are later shown on social networking sites and sometimes on TV which link rural communities with a truly global audience. This is the only program that Video Volunteers runs on its own, while all others are run with funding from other NGOs where Video Volunteers is only the trainer.

This was Video Volunteers’ flagship Community Video Unit program, created in partnership with many of the leading NGOs in India, establishes and equips locally operated video production units in severely media-deprived areas. By training eight – ten local Community Producers that make up each unit in all aspects of video production, this enables them to produce films that address issues relevant to their community, such as child marriage, health, temple prostitution, water, sanitation and women's rights. Regular screenings of the films are held for hundreds of villagers in their locale, followed by solution-centric discussions that transform ideas and images into proactive measures. However, currently none of the CVU are in production for lack of fund.

In Eastern Uttar Pradesh, one of the most underdeveloped areas in India, Video Volunteers has initiated, as part of the UNDP-IKEA a large scale micro credit initiative called Saksham. Enterprising women from within the self-help groups formed under the micro credit initiative are given training in photography and video production. By developing communication skills, the project intends women themselves to be able to document and monitor the changes.

In 2009 Video Volunteers had this program in partnership with the Brazilian NGO Casa das Caldeiras to launch VCU.br''. This program selects ten graduates of Brazilian favela media programs and trains them over a course of a year in producing and distributing videos for mainstream TV.

The Community Radio Forum-India is a registered association of community radio broadcasters, researchers and advocates in India. Video Volunteers was the secretariat of the Community Radio Forum (CRF) from September 2008 to February 2010, and Stalin K, the Managing Trustee of Video Volunteers, is the former Convener of the forum. CRF believes in the power of community radio, is committed to democratization of India's airwaves and works to enable community organizations to set up their own Community Radio Station.

Videoshala started in 2007 as a joint project by Video Volunteers and two Gujarat-based NGOs, Drishti and Udaan. Videoshala is a program that trains community members how to produce educational videos, using the visual medium to incorporate values of democracy, diversity and citizenship in the video kits. Locally trained producers from the community produce the educational videos and screen them in schools. The films are screened to children in 200 schools throughout the state of Gujarat.

In the year 2009, Video Volunteers partnered with Global Fund for children (GFC) in a pilot project called Videoactive Girls'''. Under the project, which was a learning initiative of The Nike Foundation's Brain Trust of Practitioners, VV developed a toolkit on how community-based organizations and the adolescent girls they serve can harness, produce and use the power of the visual media to tell their stories.

Research
In collaboration with the Indian Institute of Management, Ahmedabad, India's leading business school, VV implemented a research project to explore methods of evolving community-based media to generate high levels of financial sustainability. IIM's centre for Innovation, Incubation and Entrepreneurship and VV work together to explore methods and possibilities of generating revenue through the mainstream media in collaboration with other NGOs. Another area that the project aims to explore is how such community video businesses can be supported by micro credit lending.

Me Too Allegations

In October 2018, allegations of inappropriate behaviour at the workplace were made on social media against India Director & Founder Stalin K. While it was publicly announced that he had stepped down as director, internal leaks showed otherwise. The organisation's website continued to list him as 'managing trustee'. In July 2020, the Video Volunteers Board announced in a statement on its website that the Local Complaints Committee at the Office of the Collector North Goa dismissed the charge of sexual harassment against Stalin K. The post also mentioned that this finding was in alignment with the results of an independent investigation by the Video Volunteers Board of Directors.

Honors and awards
Video Volunteers has received grants from the Knight News Challenge and the Echoing Green Foundation. VV won a 2006 Tech Museum Award and the NYU Stern Business School Social Business Plan Competition in 2008.

Video Volunteers is active in the US, India, and Brazil, and has partnered with such organizations as Witness, the Global Fund for Children, Pangea Day, MTV, and others. VV was short-listed by the Development Gateway Awards, and in 2008 they were one of the five shortlisted organizations for the King Baudouin Foundation (of Belgium) International Development Prize.

Collaborations
Video Volunteers has engaged in partnership, funding, consultancy and training relationships with many leading organizations, including the UNDP, Witness, The Fledgling Fund, the Art Action Foundation of Singapore, The Global Fund for Children, Pangea Day, International Youth Foundation, HIVOS, Creative Visions Foundation and Goethe-Institut. Concepts developed by Video Volunteers have been supported by USAID, UNESCO, and the Sir Dorabji Tata Trust. In May 2010, Video Volunteers acted as the community media partner for the UN's World Summit of the Information Society (WSIS) Forum. Video Volunteers’ work has been featured on MTV, Nickelodeon, Al Jazeera, The Star Network, Pangea Day, several CNN platforms, prominent Indian news stations, and Current TV.

Notes

External links
 http://www.videovolunteers.org
 
 http://www.ch19.org
 http://current.com/items/89174339_movies-moving-mountains.htm
 https://www.pbs.org/idealab/2009/08/video-volunteers-creates-a-new-kind-of-sustainability-using-community-video233.html
 http://www.fastcompany.com/1695823/innovation-agents-jessica-mayberry-founder-video-volunteers
 http://www.cnngo.com/mumbai/tags/video-volunteers
 http://www.echoinggreen.org/fellows/jessica-mayberry
 https://web.archive.org/web/20120322190101/http://journalism.unl.edu/cojmc/news/jessicamayberry.shtml
 

International human rights organizations